Moondarra State Park is on the northern edge of the Latrobe Valley, east of Melbourne, Australia. Proclaimed in 1986, it protects  of native vegetation including Silvertop, Yertchuk, Messmate and Stringybark eucalyptus, native orchids, and Banksias.

Camping and fires are permitted within the camp, in designated areas.

Part of the former route of the narrow gauge Walhalla railway line can be followed through the park, forming the Moondarra Rail Trail.

References

State parks of Victoria (Australia)
Protected areas established in 1986
1986 establishments in Australia